Ali Wahaib Shnaiyn (born 24 December 1975) is a former Iraqi international footballer.

Career

Club football
Born in Baghdad, Shnaiyn turned professional in 1993 and has played club football in Iraq with Talaba, Arbil, Al-Shorta, Al-Naft and Al-Kahraba; in Qatar for Al-Taawun; in Romania for Sportul Studenţesc, Oţelul Galaţi and Petrolul Ploieşti; and in the United Arab Emirates for Al-Arabi.

During his time in Romania, Shnaiyn appeared in five friendly games, three youth matches, one Divizia A game, and one Cupa Ligii game.

International career
Between 2000 and 2003, Shnaiyn scored one goal in fourteen appearances for the Iraqi national team.

International goals
Scores and results list Iraq's goal tally first.

References

1975 births
Living people
Sportspeople from Baghdad
Iraqi footballers
Iraq international footballers
Iraqi expatriate footballers
Iraqi expatriate sportspeople in Romania
Expatriate footballers in Romania
1996 AFC Asian Cup players
Al-Shorta SC players
Qatar Stars League players
Al-Khor SC players
Al-Arabi SC (UAE) players
UAE First Division League players
Association football midfielders